Bladié-Tiémala is a rural commune and village in the Cercle of Bougouni in the Sikasso Region of southern Mali.

References

Communes of Sikasso Region